Cymothoe hesiodina, or Schultze's lurid glider, is a butterfly in the family Nymphalidae. It is found in Nigeria (the Cross River loop) and Cameroon. The habitat consists of forests.

References

Butterflies described in 1908
Cymothoe (butterfly)